The Gathering is the fourth album by guitarist Jon Madof's Rashanim trio featuring Shanir Ezra Blumenkranz and Mathias Kunzli which was released in 2009 on John Zorn's Tzadik Records as part of the Radical Jewish Culture Series.

Reception

All About Jazz reviewer Warren Allen said "The band has crafted an album full of beautifully deployed sounds, particularly on a series of brief musical vignettes that feature delicate little melodies teased out on eclectic instruments such as glockenspiel and melodica. It makes for an eclectic listening experience that should appeal to any lover of creative music and melody". PopMatters' writer Sean Murphy stated "Rashanim’s The Gathering is cause for joy bordering on disbelief. This, truly, is as good as contemporary music is capable of being, and the latest release is their best work yet."

Track listing 
All compositions by Jon Madof
 "Judges" - 3:28 		
 "Kings" - 5:43 		
 "Ezekiel" - 3:50
 "David" - 4:35
 "Elijah's Cup" - 1:55 		
 "Deborah" - 6:28 		
 "Elijah's Chair" - 3:19
 "Amos" - 5:01
 "Micah" - 1:37
 "Elijah's Chariot" - 1:56 		
 "Jeremiah" - 4:27
 "Joshua" - 5:28

Personnel 
 Jon Madof – guitars, banjo, vocals 
 Shanir Ezra Blumenkranz – acoustic bass guitar, bass banjo, glockenspiel, melodica, tiple, chonguri, vocals 
 Matthias Künzli – drums, percussion, jaw harp, whistling, vocals

References 

2009 albums
Tzadik Records albums
Jon Madof albums